Habsburg Hungary may refer to:

 Kingdom of Hungary during the rule of first Habsburg kings (1437–1457): Albrecht of Hungary and Ladislaus the Posthumous
 Habsburg Hungary (1526–1867), Kingdom of Hungary within the Habsburg Monarchy, and from 1804 as a crownland of the Austrian Empire, under the rule of Habsburg Dynasty
 Habsburg Hungary (1867–1918), Kingdom of Hungary within the Austria-Hungary, under the rule of Habsburg Dynasty

See also
 Habsburg (disambiguation)
 Hungary (disambiguation)
 Habsburg monarchy
 Habsburg Dynasty